Phaeoseptoria musae is a plant pathogen infecting banana and plantain.

See also 
 List of banana and plantain diseases

External links 
 Index Fungorum
 USDA ARS Fungal Database

Fungal plant pathogens and diseases
Banana diseases
Phyllachorales